Love Lies Bleeding may refer to:

Plant 
 Love-lies-bleeding (plant), an annual flowering plant

Film and television 
 Love Lies Bleeding (1993 film), a British television film by Ronan Bennett in the anthology series ScreenPlay
 Love Lies Bleeding, a 1993 BBC Northern Ireland film directed by Michael Winterbottom
 Love Lies Bleeding (1999 film), an Australian–American film with Faye Dunaway
 Love Lies Bleeding (TV series), a 2006 British thriller crime drama that aired on ITV
 Love Lies Bleeding (2008 film), an American film with Christian Slater

Music
 "Funeral for a Friend/Love Lies Bleeding", a 1973 song by Elton John
 "Love Lies Bleeding", a song by the Thompson Twins on their 1983 album, Quick Step & Side Kick
 "Love Lies Bleeding" (Sonic Animation song), 1999
 "Love Lies Bleeding", a song by Basia from her 2009 album It's That Girl Again

Written works
 "Love Lies Bleeding", an 1842 poem by William Wordsworth
 Love Lies Bleeding (novel), a 1948 detective novel by Edmund Crispin

Theatre 

 Philaster (play) or Love Lies a-Bleeding, a 1620 stage play by Francis Beaumont
 Love Lies Bleeding (ballet), a 2010 ballet choreographed by the Alberta Ballet Company
 Love-Lies-Bleeding (play), a 2005 play by Don DeLillo